In the 2021–22 season, Espérance Sportive de Tunis competed in the Ligue 1 for the 67th season, as well as the Tunisian Cup.  It was their 67th consecutive season in the top flight of Tunisian football. They competed in Ligue 1, the Champions League, the Tunisian Cup, 2019–20 Tunisian Super Cup and the 2020–21 Tunisian Super Cup.

On the domestic front, Espérance de Tunis delivered two trophies out of possible four, winning the Ligue 1, in the last round after a late 2–1 win against US Ben Guerdane, and the 2020–21 Tunisian Super Cup, but they left the Tunisian Cup against CS M'saken after a 1–1 draw after 120 minutes and a 6–5 loss on penalties.

On the continental front, Espérance de Tunis left the Champions League from the quarter-finals after a surprise loss to ES Sétif with a score of 1–0 on aggregate.

This season was the last for the two team legends, Khalil Chemmam and Sameh Derbali, who announced their retirement at the end of the season.

Squad list
Note: Flags indicate national team as has been defined under FIFA eligibility rules. Players may hold more than one non-FIFA nationality.

Staff:
 Anis Boussaïdi (assistant coach)
 Hamdi Kasraoui (goalkeeper coach)
 Sabri Bouazizi (fitness coach)
 Aymen Mathlouthi (fitness coach)
 Yassine Ben Ahmed (doctor)
 Lassad Lamari (physiotherapist)
 Nabil Ghazouani (physiotherapist)
 Seifeddine Dziri (physiotherapist)

Transfers

In

Out

Friendlies

Competitions

Overview

{| class="wikitable" style="text-align: center"
|-
!rowspan=2|Competition
!colspan=8|Record
!rowspan=2|Started round
!rowspan=2|Final position / round
!rowspan=2|First match	
!rowspan=2|Last match
|-
!
!
!
!
!
!
!
!
|-
| Ligue 1

| First round
| style="background:gold;"| Winners
| 27 October 2021
| 26 June 2022
|-
| Tunisian Cup

| Round of 32 
| Round of 16
| 3 June 2022
| 8 June 2022
|-
| 2019–20 Super Cup

| Final
| style="background:silver;"| Runners–up
| colspan=2| 18 September 2021
|-
| 2020–21 Super Cup

| Final
| style="background:gold;"| Winners
| colspan=2| 25 September 2021
|-
| Champions League

| Second round
| Quarter-finals
| 17 October 2021
| 22 April 2022
|-
! Total

|bgcolor=silver colspan=2|
! 18 September 2021
! 26 June 2022

Ligue 1

First round
Group A

League table

Results by round

Matches

Playoff

League table

Results by round

Matches

Results summary

Tunisian Cup

2019–20 Tunisian Super Cup

2020–21 Tunisian Super Cup

Champions League

Qualifying rounds

Second round

Group stage

Group C

Knockout stage

Quarter-finals

Statistics

Playing statistics

|-

‡ Player left the club mid-season

Goals

Notes

References

External links

2021-22
Tunisian football clubs 2021–22 season
2021–22 CAF Champions League participants seasons